Boubín is a 1362 m high hill in the South Bohemian region of the Czech Republic. It is 3.5 km east of Kubova Huť village. Most of the hill is covered by a primeval forest called Boubínský prales which has been a natural preserve since 1858.

References

Mountains and hills of the Czech Republic
Bohemian Forest